Carmen Bricillo (born June 14, 1976) is an American football coach who is the offensive line coach for the Las Vegas Raiders of the National Football League (NFL). He previously served as an assistant coach for the New England Patriots.

Bricillo started coaching in the NFL after playing and coaching college and high school football.

Coaching career

College coaching
After two years of coaching high school football, Carmen began his college coaching career at his alma mater Duquesne where he played center as the team's offensive line coach in 2005. From 2006 to 2008 he worked as a coaching assistant at Akron while he earned a master's in sports science and coaching at the university. Bricillo spent the 2009 season as an offensive assistant coach at Illinois. He spent the next nine years coaching the offensive line at Youngstown State.

New England Patriots
Bricillo made the jump to the NFL in 2019 when he was hired as a coaching assistant with the New England Patriots. The following year, he was promoted to co-offensive line coach for the 2020 season  alongside Cole Popovich, the two of whom would replace the retiring Dante Scarnecchia. Before the 2021 season, Bricillo was named the sole offensive line coach of the Patriots after Popovich was fired for refusing to take the Covid-19 vaccine.

Las Vegas Raiders
On February 12, 2022, Bricillo was hired by the Las Vegas Raiders as their offensive line coach under head coach Josh McDaniels.

References

External links
 Youngstown State profile
 New England Patriots profile

1976 births
Living people
Akron Zips football coaches
American football centers
Duquesne Dukes football coaches
Duquesne Dukes football players
High school football coaches in Pennsylvania
Illinois Fighting Illini football coaches
Las Vegas Raiders coaches
New England Patriots coaches
People from Indiana County, Pennsylvania
Sportspeople from Pennsylvania
Youngstown State Penguins football coaches